is a three-piece Japanese rock band which formed in 1992.

Members
Current members
  – guitars, lead vocals (1992–present)
  – bass guitar, vocals (1992–present)
  – drums (2020–present)

Former members
  – percussion (1992–1995)
  – keyboards (1993-1995)
  – drums (1995-2018)

History
The band formed in 1992, originally made up of Keiichi, Takashi and other members . In this form, they published "Cosmo-Sports" and "Super Disco". In 1994, they released "Hoshizora no doraibu" and "Cosmic Hippie". In 1995, they released their first single "Gokigenikaga?" and made their major label debut.

Maruyama Harushige later joined the band. They released the albums "Wakamonotachi" "Tokyo" "Ai-to-warai-no-yoru" and "Sunny Day Service." In 1999, they toured Japan with The Trash Can Sinatras.

The band disbanded in 2000, but Keiichi continued to make music as a solo artist.

In 2008, the band reunited. 

On July 15th, 2018, it was announced that the band's drummer, Harushige Maruyama, had died in May of that year.

Discography

Albums
 1995 - Wakamono Tachi
 1996 - Tokyo
 1997 - Ai to Warai no Yoru (Nights of Love and Laughter)
 1997 - Sunny Day Service
 1998 - 24 Ji
 1999 - Mugen
 2000 - Love Album
 2010 - Honjitsuwa seitenari
 2014 - Sunny
 2015 - Birth of a Kiss
 2016 - Dance to You
 2017 - Popcorn Ballads
 2018 - the CITY
 2019 - the SEA
 2020 - Iine!
 2022 - Doki Doki

Compilations
 2001 - Extra Best
 2001 - Complete Best

External links
Sunny Day Service Official Site (in Japanese)

References

Japanese pop music groups
Musical groups from Tokyo